Sitlington is an unincorporated community in Pocahontas County, West Virginia, United States.

The community takes its name from nearby Sitlington Creek.

References

Unincorporated communities in Pocahontas County, West Virginia
Unincorporated communities in West Virginia